Brazilla Carroll Reece (December 22, 1889 – March 19, 1961) was an American Republican Party politician from Tennessee. He represented eastern Tennessee in the United States House of Representatives for all but six years from 1921 to 1961 and served as the Chair of the Republican National Committee from 1946 to 1948. A conservative, he led the party's Old Right wing alongside Robert A. Taft in crusading against interventionism, communism, and the liberal policies pursued by the Roosevelt and Truman administrations.

From 1953 to 1954, as chairman of the House Select Committee to Investigate Tax-Exempt Foundations and Comparable Organizations, often called the Reece Committee, he led an investigation of Communist activities by non-profit organizations, particularly educational institutions and charitable foundations. The Reece Committee concluded that foundations were actively embroiled in efforts to promote socialist and collectivist ideologies.

Early life
Reece was born on a farm near Butler, Tennessee as one of thirteen children of John Isaac and Sarah Maples Reece. He was named for Brazilla Carroll McBride, an ancestor who served in the War of 1812, but never used his first name.  His brother, Raleigh Valentine Reece, was a reporter for the Nashville Tennessean and the teacher who replaced John Thomas Scopes at Rhea County High School in Dayton, Tennessee following the infamous "Monkey Trial."

Reece attended Watauga Academy in Butler, Tennessee and Carson-Newman College in Jefferson City, Tennessee. At Carson-Newman he played basketball and football. After graduating from Carson-Newman in 1914 as class valedictorian, he worked as a high school principal for one year, then enrolled in New York University, where he earned a master's degree in economics and finance in 1916. He also studied at the University of London.

Career
He was an assistant secretary and instructor at New York University in 1916 and 1917.

In April, 1917 Reece enlisted for World War I and attended officer training in Plattsburgh, New York.  During the war he served initially with the 166th Infantry Regiment, a unit of the 42nd Infantry Division.  He later transferred to 102nd Infantry Regiment, 26th Infantry Division.  He commanded a company, then commanded the regiment's 3rd Battalion, and attained the rank of captain.  He was discharged in 1919, and was decorated with the Distinguished Service Cross, Distinguished Service Medal, Purple Heart, and French Croix de Guerre with Palm.

He was director of the School of Business Administration of New York University in 1919 and 1920, and also studied law there.

He then passed the bar exam and opened a successful law practice in Johnson City, where he was also a banker and publisher.

Reece was married to Louise Goff, daughter of United States Senator Guy Despard Goff of West Virginia.

Congressional service
Reece served as a delegate to the Republican National Conventions in 1928, 1932, 1936, 1940, 1944, and 1948.   He was a member of the Board of Regents of the Smithsonian Institution in 1945 and 1946.

According to a 1981 pamphlet by Stephen Alan Sampson of Anti-Communist Crusade, republished by Liberty University, Reece was a conservative derided by intraparty moderates as an "Old Guard reactionary".

Denying renomination of Sam R. Sells and winning election to the U.S. House
Reece first successfully ran for the House of Representatives in 1920, challenging incumbent Republican Sam R. Sells. Although supporters of Sells initially dismissed Reece's candidacy as a joke, the political newcomer ran on his military service as Sells campaigned on his personality rather than his congressional voting record. During the campaign, Reece, who went to all counties in the district, promised to serve only up to ten years, a vow he eventually broke. He also attacked the incumbent Sells, a lumber businessman, for alleged conflicts of interest in voting to "exempt excess profit taxes on corporations," furthermore stating:

Reece ultimately defeated Sells in an upset to win the GOP nomination and cruise to victory in the general election. He would later recount his first interaction with his predecessor:

The region had voted not to secede at the state convention in 1861. This region was heavily Republican—in fact, Republicans had represented this district for all but four years since 1859, and was one of the few regions in the former Confederacy where Republicans won on a regular basis.

1920s
Once in office, Reece established services to help constituents with problems both large and small, a precedent continued by later elected Republicans from Eastern Tennessee. In 1922, Reece joined the majority of his House Republican colleagues in voting for the Dyer Anti-Lynching Bill.

In his first term, Reece was at one point arrested for engaging in homosexuality in a public bathroom. This incident later impacted him in the 1950s when the Reece Committee conducted hearings in its investigations of tax-exempt foundations.

1930 defeat, 1932 comeback
Following his first election, Reece was re-elected four consecutive times. He lost in the 1930 midterms to Independent Republican Oscar Lovette following backlash from constituents over the George W. Norris Muscle Shoals bill (the Senate version, which is considered a forerunner to the Tennessee Valley Authority) being vetoed by President Herbert Hoover as well as having failed to ensure the Cove Creek Dam being built. Many of Reece's constituents turned against him due to his siding with private enterprise in his support of Muscle Shoals development over the government initiative to provide nitrates for farmers, which Lovette emphasized his support for. The incumbent congressman, who President Hoover offered to help in his sinking re-election bid, claimed that the Muscle Shoals bill introduced by Norris which emphasized a larger size and scope of the federal government "originated in Red Russia."

Reece for his old seat in 1932, campaigning in part against the refusal of Lovette to maintain consistent affiliation as a Republican (Lovette ran as an "Independent Republican" in the general election). During this period, although he was out of office during the time, his favorability among President Hoover ensured that patronage and significant influence went through his hands rather than that of Lovette's. Reece narrowly re-emerged successfully and defeated Lovette, who in turn claimed voter fraud. An investigation by a House subcommittee uncovered some "questionable" election procedures practices, though Reece was ultimately seated.

However, the landslide defeats the GOP suffered nationally that year would mark the start of solid Democratic control in the federal government as the Great Depression continued. Reece continued being re-elected consecutively until unsuccessfully running for an open Senate seat in 1948; afterwards he returned to the House yet again and continued serving until his death. According to Tennessee historian Ray Hill, a historian who writes for The Knoxville Focus:

Return to the House
Reece thus returned to Congress, serving until 1947, when he stepped down to devote his full energies to serving as chairman of the Republican National Committee, a position he had held since 1946.

An adamant conservative, Reece generally opposed the New Deal during the presidency of Franklin D. Roosevelt along with liberal initiatives such as a federal wage and price controls. He was also an isolationist, according to Sampson, and a non-interventionist prior to World War II and voted against the Lend-Lease Act. A supporter of civil rights, he advocated the passage of federal anti-lynching legislation and anti-poll tax measures.

A member of the conservative "Old Guard" faction of the Republican Party, Reece was a strong supporter of Ohio Senator Robert A. Taft, the leader of the GOP's conservative wing. In 1948 and 1952 Reece was a leading supporter of Taft's candidacy for the Republican presidential nomination; however, Taft lost the nomination both times to moderate Republicans from New York.

Reece was the Republican nominee for an open Senate seat in 1948, but lost to Democratic Congressman Estes Kefauver, who had unseated incumbent Democrat Tom Stewart in the party primary. Kefauver carried the support of the influential editor Edward J. Meeman of the now-defunct Memphis Press-Scimitar, who had for years fought to topple the Edward "Boss" Crump political machine in Memphis. Crump supported Stewart.

Republican Party leadership
Allied with Ohio senator Taft, who he joined in opposing President Harry S. Truman's anti-inflation plan, Reece succeeded Herbert Brownell, Jr. (later United States Attorney General under president Dwight D. Eisenhower), as the chair of the Republican National Committee in early April 1946 and presided over GOP victories in the 1946 midterms. Due to his independent wealth inherited from his father-in-law, Reece did not accept a salary.

During his tenure in leading the GOP on the national stage, Reece was a part of the conservative faction opposed by Minnesota liberal Republican Harold Stassen and Vermont Moderate Republican George Aiken. In February 1948, Reece called for purging communists from the United States, asserting:

Reece also opposed President Truman's use of "public funds" for his Western trip, calling it a "pre-nomination campaign tour."

Defeating Phillips, returning to the U.S. House
In 1950, Reece ran against the man who succeeded him in the House, Dayton Phillips, and defeated him in the Republican primary.  This all but assured him of a return to Congress in the heavily Republican district.  He was reelected five more times.  When the Republicans gained control of the House after the 1952 elections, Reece served as chairman of the Select Committee to Investigate Tax-Exempt Foundations and Comparable Organizations, losing this post after the Democrats regained control in 1955.

In the 1952 United States presidential election, Reece threw support to Robert A. Taft, who he predicted the GOP delegations in Southern and border states would support. Taft ultimately lost in the Republican primaries to the more moderate Dwight D. Eisenhower, an internationalist.

During his time in Congress, he was a social and fiscal conservative who supported isolationism and civil rights legislation, being one of the few Southern Congressmen who declined to sign the 1956 anti-desegregation Southern Manifesto and voted in favor of the Civil Rights Acts of 1957 and 1960. He was a rarity in politics at the time—a truly senior Republican congressman from a former Confederate state.

International controversy
During the Cold War, Reece's statement that "The citizens of Danzig are German as they always had been" caused a reply from Jędrzej Giertych, a leading Polish emigrant in London and writer, publicist, and publisher of National Democratic background. Danzig was separated from Germany and had been established as the Free City of Danzig in accordance with the Treaty of Versailles following World War I. It was annexed by Nazi Germany in 1939 and subsequently grouped with Poland in the Potsdam Agreement.

Reece was opposed to the Oder-Neisse line, advocating the return to Germany of its former Eastern territories.

Cox Committee
Reece was a member of the 1952 Select Committee to Investigate Tax-Exempt Foundations and Comparable Organizations, established by the House in April that year to probe major foundations for subversive activities. It was known during the congressional session as the Cox Committee, named after its chair Eugene "Goober" Cox, a Democratic segregationist from Georgia.

Due to family illnesses, Reece was absent for most of the hearings the Cox Committee conducted. Cox suddenly died in December 1952, and the final report which was soon released cleared the investigated foundations of any wrongdoing. Reece asserted the following, as listed in the Cox Committee report:

Among the remaining committee members, only Reece sought a do-over, believing that the scope of the investigations were insufficient. He in addition stated in a long, detailed House speech:

The Cox Committee report recommended a possible investigation of whether major foundations used their privileges for the purpose of tax evasion, as stated in page 12 of the report:

Reece ignored this aspect and only focused on subversive activities. Texas liberal populist Democrat Wright Patman later took up the report's particular suggestion in the 1960s as chairman of the Select Committee on Small Business, also known as the Patman Committee.

Reece Committee

Reece led the House Select Committee to Investigate Tax-Exempt Foundations and Comparable Organizations which investigated the use of funds by tax-exempt non-profit organizations, and in particular foundations, to determine if they were using their funds to support communism in educational institutions. Reece selected attorney Norman Dodd to lead the investigation, which lasted eighteen months. Reece would later declare that "The evidence that has been gathered by the staff pointed to one simple underlying situation, namely that the major foundations, by subsidizing collectivistic-minded educators, had financed a socialist trend in American government."

Reece's arrest for homosexuality in the early 1920s was essentially "held over him" decades past its occurrence. He failed to rule Democratic ranking member Wayne Hays out of order in the hearings when the latter exhibited excessively rude behavior, as the Ohio representative could publicize Reece's past scandal in retaliation if harshly rebuked by Reece.

Death and legacy
Reece died of lung cancer on March 19, 1961 in Bethesda, Maryland, just two months after being sworn in for his 18th term.  He served in the House longer than anyone else in Tennessee history (though Jimmy Quillen, who eventually succeeded him as the 1st District's congressman, holds the record for the longest unbroken tenure in the House for a Tennessee congressman), and only Kenneth McKellar served in both houses longer. Reece's wife, Louise, was elected to serve the remainder of his unexpired term in Congress. Both are buried at Monte Vista Memorial Park in Johnson City, Tennessee.

He received several honorary degrees, including LL.D.s from Cumberland University and Tusculum College, and an L.H.D. from Lincoln Memorial University.

See also

 List of United States Congress members who died in office (1950–99)

References

External links
B. Carroll Reece Archives
 Retrieved on 2008-07-24
B. Carroll Reece Gravesite

 The Political Graveyard

|-

|-

|-

|-

|-

1889 births
1961 deaths
20th-century American politicians
Activists for African-American civil rights
Alumni of the University of London
American anti-communists
American anti-lynching activists
United States Army personnel of World War I
Candidates in the 1948 United States presidential election
Carson–Newman University alumni
Burials in Tennessee
Deaths from cancer in Maryland
Deaths from lung cancer
New York University alumni
New York University faculty
Old Right (United States)
People from Johnson County, Tennessee
Recipients of the Croix de Guerre 1914–1918 (France)
Recipients of the Distinguished Service Cross (United States)
Republican National Committee chairs
Republican Party members of the United States House of Representatives from Tennessee
United States Army officers